Andre Vernell Jones (born July 22, 1956) and Freddie Clyde Tiller Jr. (born August 17, 1957) are American spree killers who killed three people in East St. Louis, Illinois in 1979. Jones is also a serial killer, committing at least two additional murders.

Jones and Tiller committed their crimes at the same time and in the same region as Girvies Davis and Richard Holman. Consequently, all four men received extensive local media coverage.

Early life 
Prior to the murders, Jones had a lengthy criminal history, starting with purse-snatching when he was 12 years old. His prior convictions included theft, shoplifting, armed robberies and attempted murder. At the time of the 1979 murder, Jones was on parole after serving 4 years and three months of a 4 to 12 year sentence for armed robbery.

Murders and arrest 
In 1980, Jones confessed to committing a triple murder in 1971, when he was 14 years old. The alleged victims were Arthur Lee Walson, 21, and brothers Frank Slaughter, 23, and Jack Slaughter, 21, and had been shot and stabbed. Jones said he killed the men for failing to pay him money for drugs he gave them. An officer said he didn't report Jones's confession since he believed that he was too young to have committed the murders on his own. Jones refused to say if he had an accomplice in the alleged murders. 

In November 1978, Jones murdered Michael Wallace, 67, and Dora Wallace, 55, in their home. He decapitated Michael and stabbed Dora to death, before torching their house. Jones confessed to the murders after his arrest, but was never tried for them.

On April 30, 1979, Jones, along with Tiller, killed three people. The first victim was 63-year-old Richard Stoltz. Stoltz, a World War II veteran, was in the back of a pickup truck, stacking bricks. Tiller said he was going to rob Stoltz and asked Jones for a gun. After Jones gave him a gun, Tiller approached Stoltz and told him he was being robbed. When Stolz tried to raise his hands in surrender, Tiller shot him in the left eye, killing him. He then took Stoltz's wallet, keys, and watch. Tiller's cousin, Lori Elem, who was also Jones's girlfriend, witnessed the robbery-slaying and would later testify at their trials.

Afterwards, Jones told Tiller "Man, you shot the shit out of that honky," to which he replied, "I mean business. He wouldn't up the cash."

Jones and Tiller then decided to rob a dry cleaning store. They entered the store, and Jones immediately shot the proprietor, 23-year-old Samuel Nersesian, in the head, then shot him a second time after he fell to the floor. The two then emptied the store's cash register. Tiller left the store, and shortly after, a mailwoman, 22-year-old Debra Brown, entered the store. At his trial, Tiller claimed he told Jones not to hurt Brown. However, Jones hid behind the door, and ambushed her when she entered. He grabbed her around the neck, pushed her into the business's kitchen, and shot her twice, once in the chest and once in the mouth. Jones and Tiller then left the store. They were arrested on May 4, 1979.

Trial and incarceration 
Jones and Tiller were indicted for three counts of murder. On August 23, 1979, Jones pleaded guilty to three counts of murder. He was sentenced to death.

Prior to Tiller's trial, he filed a motion to have the murder charge relating to Stoltz's death severed since it was a separate offense. The motion was granted, and prosecutors ultimately never tried him in that case since he was already facing possible execution. In September 1979, Tiller was convicted of two counts of murder and two counts of armed robbery and sentenced to death. On appeal, his death sentences and one of his robbery convictions were overturned. The Supreme Court of Illinois ordered for Tiller to be given a sentence other than death, saying it was not proven that he intended for Nersesian or Brown to die. However, they upheld his murder convictions on the grounds that Tiller knew that Jones might hurt them and did nothing to stop that from happening.

Tiller was resentenced to life in prison without parole, but was granted another sentencing hearing after one of the aggravating factors used against him when he was initially sentenced was dismissed. At Tiller's resentencing hearing, the prosecution asked for another life term, or a 160-year sentence. Tiller's public defender asked for the minimum sentence of 20 years, saying Tiller had a mental disorder, was borderline mentally disabled, and suffered from alcoholism. The judge resentenced him to two consecutive 40-year terms for each murder, saying he was unsure if Tiller's role in the murders met the qualifications for a life sentence or an extended term of 40 to 80 years in a prison (at the time, murder conviction without aggravating circumstances carried a sentence of 20 to 40 years in prison in Illinois). He was released from prison on May 3, 2019, but sent back for parole violations. Tiller was released once more in 2022.

On January 11, 2003, Jones's sentence was commuted to life in prison without parole after Governor George Ryan granted blanket clemency to all 167 people on death row in Illinois over his growing concerns over capital punishment. By the time his sentence was commuted, Jones had completely exhausted his appeals.

Stoltz, who had four daughters, spent his free time on music, playing the violin and bass horn in his personal band, the Richard Stoltz Orchestra. The group performed at weddings and halls around Belleville, Illinois. One of Stoltz's daughters was outraged over Jones's commutation, saying she hoped "that when Ryan gets to Hell that he and Andre Jones have a real good time together."

See also
 List of serial killers in the United States

References

20th-century American criminals
American male criminals
American people convicted of murder
American serial killers
American spree killers
Criminal duos
Male serial killers
People convicted of murder by Illinois